Tarek Al-Ghoussein (17 January 1962 – 11 June 2022), was a Kuwaiti multi-genre artist best known for his work that investigates the margins between landscape photography, self-portraiture, and performance art. His work moved away from subjects of land, belonging, nostalgia and barriers and instead gravitated toward the metaphorical transit to his ancestral homeland - Palestine. He moved between abstraction and the explicit conditions found in certain places.

Career
Tarek Al-Ghoussein was born in Kuwait to Kuwaiti parents of Palestinian ancestry who were originally displaced from their ancestral homeland in Ramleh, Palestine. His father, Talat Al-Ghoussein, was a famous Kuwaiti journalist, editor and a diplomat who served as the Kuwaiti Ambassador to the United States during the 1960s. His family moved a lot during his childhood between Kuwait, United States, Morocco, and Japan. He received his bachelor's degree in photography from New York University and completed his master's degree in Fine Arts from University of New Mexico. He held several positions during his career, worked as a photojournalist, taught photography at the American University of Sharjah, and at the time of his death was a professor at New York University branch in Abu Dhabi.

Selected exhibitions 
 1995 Zwemmers Fine Photographs, London, UK
 2000 Sharjah Art Museum, Sharjah, UAE
 2003 Randolph Street Gallery, Auckland, New Zealand
 2004 Spectra Art Gallery, Copenhagen, Denmark
 2004 Noorderlicht International Photography Exhibition, The Netherlands
 2005 Sharjah International Biennial, Sharjah, UAE
 2006 Political Realities, Heidelberg Museum, Heidelberg, Germany
 2007 Art in Public Spaces, Light Boxes, Muscat, Oman
 2008 Wonder, Singapore Biennale, Singapore
 2009 In Absentia, Al Ma'mal Foundation for Contemporary Art, Jerusalem
 2011 Emirati Expressions, Manarat Al Saadiyat, Abu Dhabi, UAE
 2013 National Pavilion of Kuwait, 55th Venice Biennale, Venice, Italy 
 2014 K Files, Taymour Grahne Gallery, New York, USA

Collection 
Tarek's work has been collected by numerous museums and foundations worldwide such as Solomon R. Guggenheim Museum, New York; Victoria and Albert Museum, London; Royal Museum of Photography, Copenhagen; Darat Al-Funun, Amman, Jordan; Mathaf Museum, Doha, Qatar; Barjeel Art Foundation, Sharjah, UAE; British Museum, London, UK; Mori Art Museum, Tokyo, Japan; the Museum of Fine Arts, Houston, Texas, and the Sharjah Art Foundation in Sharjah, UAE.

Publications 
 Tarek Al-Ghoussein: Transfigurations
 In Absentia: Photographs by Tarek Al-Ghoussein

References 

1962 births
2022 deaths
Kuwaiti contemporary artists
Palestinian contemporary artists
Kuwaiti people of Palestinian descent